Nunc Dimittis or Sacred Conversation is a 1505–1510 oil on panel painting by Giovanni Bellini. It measures 62 cm by 83 cm and is now in the Museo Thyssen-Bornemisza in Madrid. It belongs to the sacra conversazione genre and shows Anna and Simeon with the Madonna and Child.

1510 paintings
Paintings by Giovanni Bellini
Paintings in the Thyssen-Bornemisza Museum